Nycteola columbiana is a species of nolid moth in the family Nolidae. It is found in North America.

The MONA or Hodges number for Nycteola columbiana is 8976.

References

Further reading

 
 
 

Chloephorinae
Articles created by Qbugbot
Moths described in 1873